The following is a list of Grammy Awards winners and nominees from Canada (This page only includes the competitive awards which have been won by various artists/producers, and does not include the various special awards that are presented by the Recording Academy such as Lifetime Achievement Awards, Trustees Awards, Technical Awards or Legend Awards):

References

Canadian
Grammy Award